Kaustubha is a divine ruby or ratnam (gem) in Hindu mythology. This gem is in the possession of Vishnu, granting him the epithet of Kaustubhadhari. It is believed in Hindu scriptures to be the most magnificent ratnam in all of creation, at the time of the churning of the ocean, and acts as a symbol of divine authority.

Legend 

In Hindu mythology, the devas and the asuras performed the churning of the ocean of milk (Samudra Manthana) in order to obtain amrita, the elixir of immortality. During this process, fourteen jewels (ratnas) emerged from the ocean. Among the first few treasures that emerged was the kaustubha, described to be an "excellent gem, the lotus-hued ruby".

The Skanda Purana describes the nature of this gem: 

Krishna is described to be wearing the ruby in the Mahabharata:

See also 
Chintamani Gem
Navaratna
Shrivatsa
Syamantaka Gem

References

Mythological objects

Hindu mythology
Vaishnavism
Vishnu